Éamon Zayed (born 4 October 1983) is a former professional footballer who played as a forward. He is currently the head coach of Northern Colorado Hailstorm FC in USL League One. Born in the Republic of Ireland, he represented the Libya national team as a player.

Zayed gained international fame on 2 February 2012 after scoring a hat-trick in the final ten minutes of the Tehran derby against Esteghlal in a match where Persepolis were one man down and losing 2–0 until the 82nd minute, and which was later referred to as "10 minutes with 10 men" or "10-10-3".

Youth career
Zayed started his career with Broadford Rovers before moving to St. Joseph's Boys AFC, based in Sallynoggin, Dublin. While with the club, Zayed was selected at U-16 and U-17 levels for both the Leinster Schoolboys and Dublin teams, and was on the Leinster Schools team at U-17. In two years at Leicester City, he played for their youth (U-18), U-19 and Reserve sides. He then returned to Ireland after Leicester's relegation from the English Premiership in 2002.

Senior club career

Bray Wanderers
He joined Bray Wanderers and after impressing in the Under-21s, Zayed soon graduated to the senior team making his League of Ireland debut on 18 October 2002 at the Carlisle Grounds. He scored the fastest hat-trick ever by a Bray Wanderers player against Dundalk in 2003 within a nine-minute spell from the 7th to the 15th minute.

Zayed signed for Crewe Alexandra in February 2004 on loan, but returned to Bray in May without having made a first team appearance at Gresty Road.  Zayed was the PFAI Young Player of the Year for 2003. He represented the Eircom League Under-21s in a four nations tournament in Scotland in May 2004 and earned his second U-21 international cap against Scotland in May 2004 in Galway. In October 2004, Zayed became the first Bray player to score four goals in one match, in a 5–3 win over Athone Town. He again left Bray on loan in August 2005, this time for Aalesunds in Norway. He made one appearance for the club, coming on as a substitute in a 4–1 defeat by Molde.

Drogheda United
Zayed signed for Drogheda United in July 2006 on a two and a half-year full-time contract, and scored on his debut on 7 July. His first of 5 goals in the Europa League came in a 1–1 draw with IK Start in August 2006. The following season he scored at A.C. Libertas. His third Drogheda goal in European competition came against Helsingborgs IF. He was a key part of the Drogheda team that won their first League of Ireland title in 2007 and finished as their top scorer.

Sporting Fingal
In the midst of great financial uncertainty at Drogheda at the end of the 2008 season, Zayed was released from his contract. He went on trial at Incheon United in the K-League, but eventually decided to remain in Ireland and moved to Sporting Fingal in January 2009. He scored twice against his former club Bray in Fingal's 4–2 FAI Cup semi-final victory in October 2009. He also scored twice against C.S. Marítimo in July 2010 in Sporting Fingal's European debut. He was released by Sporting Fingal at the end of the 2010 season. He was set to sign for Al Ahly in the Libyan Premier League, but the transfer was blocked following the introduction of a new rule preventing foreign-born Libyan internationals under the age of 30 from playing in the league.

Derry City
He joined Derry City in January 2011 on a free transfer, signing a one-year contract. In his first season at Derry, Zayed finished as the league's top scorer with 23 goals (helping the club to European qualification), and also scored the winner in the Candystripes' League Cup final victory over Cork City. Zayed gained himself a place in the Premier Division team of the season, and went on to win the PFAI Players' Player of the Year award.

At the end of the 2012 League of Ireland season Zayed is joint twenty fourth in the all-time League of Ireland goalscoring list with 118 league goals

Persepolis
On 23 December 2011, Zayed signed a 6-month contract with Iran Pro League side, Persepolis. He wore the number 12 shirt.

On 2 February 2012, he came on as a substitute in his first appearance, in the Tehran derby with Persepolis being reduced to 10 men and 2–0 behind, he scored in the 82nd minute to make it 2–1 with a right-footed curling shot. Two minutes later, he headed home an angled cross to level the game. In the 92nd minute of the match Zayed put Persepolis into a 3–2 lead in dramatic style to be the first non-Iranian player to net a hat-trick in the Tehran derby.
He was voted World Player of the Week after the Tehran derby by Goal.com.

On 21 March 2012, Zayed scored a second hat-trick against Al-Shabab in AFC Champions League. This was the first hat-trick a Persepolis player had scored in the AFC Champions League. Persepolis won the game 6–1. Zayed scored another hat-trick against Rah Ahan F.C. on 6 May 2012. Persepolis fans then began referring to Zayed as “Mr. hat-trick”. Due to his great performances and popularity with the fans, Persepolis extended his contract for the new season 2012–2013. However, he decided to leave his team before end of the season and on 24 November 2012, Perspolis and Zayed officially agreed to cancel his contract.

Aluminium Hormozgan
On 11 January 2013, Zayed joined another Iranian club, Aluminium Hormozgan and signed a contract with this team until the end of the season.

Shamrock Rovers

On 3 July 2013, Zayed made a return to the League of Ireland when he signed an 18-month contract with Shamrock Rovers. He made his debut in a friendly against Birmingham City. He scored his first league goal for Rovers on 16 July.

Sligo Rovers (loan)
On 31 July 2014, he joined Sligo Rovers on loan until the end of the season.

Sabah FA 
In December 2014, Zayed joined Sabah FA. On 6 February 2015, Eamon scored his first goal against Kuala Lumpur SPA bringing the team towards victory.

Indy Eleven
On December 23, 2015, Zayed signed with the NASL side, Indy Eleven. On April 16, 2016, Zayed scored two late goals against the New York Cosmos, leading his side to a 2–1 victory, and earning Player of the Week honors. On June 11, Zayed scored a hat-trick in the final game of the Spring season, a 4–1 victory over the Carolina RailHawks. This result evened the Eleven and the Cosmos atop the table on goals scored and allowed, with Indy holding the tiebreaker based on their head-to-head result with New York.

Charlotte Independence
On March 23, 2018, Zayed signed with USL side Charlotte Independence for the 2018 season.

Chattanooga Red Wolves
On October 24, 2018, it was announced that Zayed would join USL League One side Chattanooga Red Wolves SC ahead of their inaugural season in 2019.

International career

Republic of Ireland
Zayed was eligible to play international football for Republic of Ireland, Tunisia, as a result of his father, and Libya, as a result of his grandparents, however he chose to begin his international career with Ireland. Zayed made his international debut for the Irish U-20s against South Korea in January 2003 in a pre-World Cup tournament and followed up with two goals against the United Arab Emirates two days later in a 3–2 win. He made his U-21 debut for Ireland against Poland in a 5–1 away win in August 2003. Zayed played in all four of Ireland's games in the 2003 FIFA World Youth Championship, held in the UAE, starting two and making two appearances as a substitute. Following the tournament, he was contacted by both the Tunisian and Libyan FAs with a view to declaring for either, however, Zayed declined as he wanted to pursue his dream of representing Ireland at senior level.

Libya
With no further caps at underage level for Ireland, and the chances of him receiving any senior caps looking slim, Zayed declared for Libya in October 2010. He received his first call up to the Libyan national team from Brazilian coach, Marcos Paquetá, for an African Cup of Nations qualifier against Zambia in the same month. He made his debut a few weeks later in a friendly against Niger. After impressing on his debut, Zayed was called up to Libya's 23-man training squad for the 2012 Africa Cup of Nations in November 2011. He went on to play in the 2011 Pan Arab Games in Doha, Qatar, gaining three caps against Sudan, Palestine and Jordan. He scored his first goal for his country on 4 September 2013 against Equatorial Guinea in an international friendly, scoring the Libyan goal of the 1–1 draw.

International goals
Score and Result list Libya's goal tally first

|-
| 1. || 4 September 2013 || Nuevo Estadio de Malabo, Malabo, Equatorial Guinea ||  || 1–1 || 1–1 || Friendly || Equatorial Guinea vs. Libya (1:1)
|}

Coaching career
On August 11, 2021, Zayed was hired as the first ever head coach of Northern Colorado Hailstorm FC, which began playing in USL League One, starting in the 2022 season. He possesses a UEFA "A" coaching license.

Personal life
Eamon's father is Libyan and his mother is Irish. His younger brother has played for University College Dublin A.F.C. in the 2012–13 FAI U19 League.

Honours
 Drogheda United :
  League of Ireland (1): 2007
  Setanta Sports Cup (1): 2007
 Sporting Fingal :
 FAI Cup (1): 2009
 Derry City :
 League of Ireland Cup (1): 2011
 PFAI Players' Player of the Year (1): 2011
 PFAI Young Player of the Year (1): 2003

References

External links

 
 
 
 

1983 births
Living people
Association footballers from County Dublin
Libyan footballers
Libya international footballers
Republic of Ireland association footballers
Republic of Ireland youth international footballers
Republic of Ireland under-21 international footballers
Irish people of Libyan descent
Irish sportspeople of African descent
Association football forwards
Leicester City F.C. players
Bray Wanderers F.C. players
Drogheda United F.C. players
Sporting Fingal F.C. players
Derry City F.C. players
Aalesunds FK players
Persepolis F.C. players
Aluminium Hormozgan F.C. players
Shamrock Rovers F.C. players
Sligo Rovers F.C. players
Sabah F.C. (Malaysia) players
Indy Eleven players
Charlotte Independence players
Chattanooga Red Wolves SC players
Eliteserien players
Persian Gulf Pro League players
Expatriate footballers in Iran
League of Ireland XI players
League of Ireland players
North American Soccer League players
Expatriate footballers in Norway
A Championship players
20th-century Irish people
21st-century Irish people
USL League One players
USL League One coaches
Expatriate soccer managers in the United States
Republic of Ireland football managers
Libyan football managers
Republic of Ireland expatriate football managers
Libyan expatriate sportspeople in the United States
Irish expatriate sportspeople in the United States
Expatriate footballers in England
Irish expatriate sportspeople in England
Irish expatriate sportspeople in Norway
Expatriate footballers in Malaysia
Irish expatriate sportspeople in Malaysia
Northern Colorado Hailstorm FC